The 150th Regiment Illinois Volunteer Infantry was an infantry regiment that served in the Union Army during the American Civil War.

Service
The 150th Illinois Infantry was organized at Camp Butler, Illinois, and mustered into Federal service on February 14, 1865, for a one-year enlistment.  The 150th served in garrisons in Tennessee and Georgia.

Total strength and casualties
The regiment suffered 58 enlisted men who died of disease for a total of 58 fatalities.

Commanders
Colonel George W. Keener - mustered out with the regiment.

See also
List of Illinois Civil War Units
Illinois in the American Civil War

Notes

References
The Civil War Archive

Units and formations of the Union Army from Illinois
1865 establishments in Illinois
Military units and formations established in 1865
Military units and formations disestablished in 1866
1866 disestablishments in Illinois